The Norwegian Industrial Property Office ( or Patentstyrets første avdeling), also known as Norwegian Patent Office, is a government agency responsible for registration of patents, trademarks and design in Norway. The agency is subordinate to the Ministry of Trade and Industry and located in Oslo.

See also 
 Nordic Patent Institute

References 

Government agencies of Norway
Norwegian intellectual property law
Patent offices
Trademark law organizations